Khawaja Muhammad Taqi (born 1918) was a Pakistani field hockey player. He competed in the men's tournament at the 1948 Summer Olympics.

References

External links
 

1918 births
Possibly living people
Pakistani male field hockey players
Olympic field hockey players of Pakistan
Field hockey players at the 1948 Summer Olympics
Field hockey players from Delhi
Indian emigrants to Pakistan
20th-century Pakistani people